Korthio is a former municipality on the island of Andros, in the Cyclades, Greece. Since the 2011 local government reform it is part of the municipality Andros, of which it is a municipal unit. Its population was 1,948 inhabitants at the 2011 census, and its land area is 81.918 km². It shares the island of Andros with the municipal unit of Andros and Ydrousa.

External links
Official website

References

Populated places in Andros